Ypsolopha rubrella is a moth of the family Ypsolophidae. It is found in the United States from California east to Colorado and Oklahoma.

The wingspan is about 18 mm.

The larvae feed on Berberis repens in Colorado and Berberis nervosa in coastal California.

References

Ypsolophidae
Moths of North America
Fauna of the California chaparral and woodlands
Fauna of the Sierra Nevada (United States)